Wild Flavors, Inc. (stylized as  "WILD Flavors") is a manufacturer of flavors, colors, and food and beverage ingredients Its headquarters are in Erlanger, Kentucky and the firm is affiliated with Rudolf WILD GmbH & Co. KG and Dr. Hans-Peter Wild.

Major competitors include Givaudan, Firmenich, and International Flavors and Fragrances.

In July 2014 the company announced it was being taken over by Archer Daniels Midland in a $3 billion deal. Subject to regulatory approvals the takeover was expected to close before the end of 2014.

History
Acquisitions
 1994 - F&C Company in Cincinnati, OH was acquired and renamed WILD Flavors Inc
 1995 - DRI Flavors, Canada
 1997 - La Monde Ltd in Placentia, CA
 2008 - American Purpac Technologies in Beloit, WI
 2014 - Archer Daniels Midland said it will buy Wild Flavors for $3 billion.

Partnerships
 2006 - Cognis Health & Wellness
 2007 - Diversified Natural Products
 2009 - Sunwin International

Products
 Resolver Technology - A mix of natural flavors and flavor extracts. It neutralises undesirable off-notes of ingredients having a bitter, soapy, metallic or burning aftertaste.
 SaltTrim - Allows reducing the amount of salt in foods and beverages products without impairing the taste.
 Colors From Nature - A line of natural colors and plant extracts .

References

External links

 Official WILD Flavors Website

Food and drink companies based in Kentucky
Flavor companies
Kenton County, Kentucky
Privately held companies based in Kentucky